SS304 may refer to:

 The Balao-submarine USS Seahorse (SS-304)
 The grade 304 stainless steel family of SAE steel grades